The Overberg District Municipality is a district municipality that governs the Overberg region in the Western Cape province of South Africa. It is divided into four local municipalities and includes the major towns of Grabouw, Caledon, Hermanus, Bredasdorp and Swellendam.

Geography 
The Overberg municipal area covers  lying to the south-east of Cape Town. It stretches from the Hottentots-Holland mountains in the west to the Breede River mouth in the east, and as far as the Riviersonderend Mountains in the north. It includes Cape Agulhas, the southernmost point in Africa, and has coastline on both the Atlantic Ocean and the Indian Ocean.

The largest town is Grabouw (pop. 44,593) in the Elgin Valley adjacent to the Hottentots-Holland on the north-western edge of the district. The municipal headquarters are located at Bredasdorp (pop. 12,749) in the southern part of the district. Other major towns are Swellendam (pop. 13,557) on the Breede River in the north-east, Caledon (pop. 10,650) in the western interior, and Hermanus (pop. 10,500) on the Atlantic coast.

The Overberg district is divided into four local municipalities, which are described in the following table.

It borders on the City of Cape Town to the west, the Cape Winelands District Municipality to the north, and the Garden Route District Municipality to the east.

Demographics
The following statistics are from the 2011 Census. Note that due to fuzzing applied to statistics, columns may not sum to exactly the indicated total.

Politics

The council of the Overberg District Municipality consists of twenty-one councillors. Nine councillors are directly elected by party-list proportional representation, and twelve are appointed by the councils of the local municipalities in the district: five by Theewaterskloof, four by Overstrand, two by Cape Agulhas and one by Swellendam.

After the elections of 3 August 2016, fourteen of the councillors are Democratic Alliance (DA) representatives and seven are African National Congress (ANC) representatives. The mayor is Andries Franken and the deputy mayor is Archibald Klaas; both are members of the DA. The following table shows the composition of the council after the 2016 election.

The following table shows the results of the election of the nine directly-elected members on 3 August 2016.

References

External links

 Official website
 Overberg District Municipality on the Western Cape Government website
 Electronic Gateway to the Cape Overberg
 Overberg Website

District municipalities of the Western Cape
Overberg District Municipality